The 1939 Cal Aggies football team represented the College of Agriculture at Davis—now known as the University of California, Davis—as a member of the Far Western Conference (FWC) during the 1939 college football season. Led by third-year head coach Vern Hickey, the Aggies compiled an overall record of 4–4 with a mark of 0–3 in conference play, placing last out of five teams in the FWC. The team outscored its opponents 92 to 73 for the season. The Cal Aggies played home games at A Street field on campus in Davis, California.

Schedule

Notes

References

Cal Aggies
UC Davis Aggies football seasons
Cal Aggies football